In enzymology, a 2'-phosphotransferase is an enzyme that catalyzes the chemical reaction

2'-phospho-[ligated tRNA] + NAD+  mature tRNA + ADP-ribose 1,2-phosphate + nicotinamide + H2O

Thus, the two substrates of this enzyme are [[2'-phospho-[ligated tRNA]]] and NAD+, whereas its 4 products are mature tRNA, ADP-ribose 1,2-phosphate, nicotinamide, and H2O.

This enzyme belongs to the family of transferases, specifically those transferring phosphorus-containing groups (phosphotransferases) with an alcohol group as acceptor.  The systematic name of this enzyme class is 2'-phospho-[ligated tRNA]:NAD+ phosphotransferase. Other names in common use include yeast 2'-phosphotransferase, Tpt1, Tpt1p, and 2'-phospho-tRNA:NAD+ phosphotransferase.

References

 
 
 
 
 
 
 
 

EC 2.7.1
NADH-dependent enzymes
Enzymes of unknown structure